Orca Bay may refer to:

Orca Bay Sports and Entertainment, an ice hockey company which became Canucks Sports and Entertainment in 2008
Orca Bay, Alaska, near Hawkins Island 
Orca Inlet, Alaska, on the east and south of Hawkins Island